Margarinotus felipae is a species of clown beetle in the family Histeridae.

References

Further reading

 
 

Histeridae
Articles created by Qbugbot
Beetles described in 1901